Siju Wildlife Sanctuary is situated in the South Garo Hills district of Meghalaya, India. It is the first and oldest wildlife sanctuary in Meghalaya. It is also known as Siju Bird Sanctuary as it is a home for many rare and protected birds such as the Grey Hornbill. Other migratory birds such as Siberian ducks and spoonbills are also sighted here.

Location 
Situated in the South Garo Hills, Siju Wildlife Sanctuary is the oldest Wildlife Sanctuary in the state of Meghalaya. It is located at a distance of about 450 km away from Shillong.

Wildlife 
Siju Wildlife Sanctuary is home to many endemic and rare flora and fauna. Many animal species such as elephants, Sambar deer, wild boars, leopards, tigers, barking deer, etc., and migratory birds, namely Grey Hornbills, spoonbills, and Siberian ducks are sighted here. Other primates such as the slow loris, Hoolock gibbon, and langurs are also found there. Peacock-pheasant also inhabit Siju Wildlife Sanctuary.

References 

Wildlife sanctuaries in Meghalaya
South Garo Hills district
Year of establishment missing